The 2002 farm bill (P.L. 101-171, Sec. 10807) directed the establishment of a Food Safety Commission composed of 15 members appointed by the President. The Commission was to report within a year to the President and the Congress on enhancing the food safety system of the United States.

References

See also 
 Food Administration

United States Department of Agriculture